Äteritsiputeritsipuolilautatsijänkä is a bog region in Savukoski, Lapland in Finland. Its name is 35 letters long and is the longest place name in Finland, and also the third longest, if names with spaces or hyphens are included, in Europe. It has also been the longest official place name in the European Union since 31 January 2020, when Brexit was completed, as the record was previously held by Llanfair­pwllgwyngyllgogerychwyrndrobwll­llan­tysiliogogogoch, a village in Wales, United Kingdom.

Overview
A pub in Salla was named Äteritsiputeritsipuolilautatsi-baari after this bog region. According to an anecdote, the owner of the pub tried two different names for it, but both had already been taken. Frustrated, he registered the pub under a name he knew no one else would be using. The pub also had the longest name of a registered commercial establishment in Finland. The bar was in practice known as Äteritsi-baari. The pub was closed in April 2006.

The etymology is not known, although the name has been confirmed as genuine. Other than jänkä "bog", lauta "board" and puoli "half", it does not mean anything in Finnish, and was probably never intended to be anything else than alliterative gibberish.

References 

Savukoski
Bogs of Finland
Landforms of Lapland (Finland)